Rana Ranbir Singh is an Indian Punjabi actor working in Punjabi cinema and Hindi cinema.

Early life and education
After completing a bachelor's degree from Desh Bhagat College Dhuri, he received a postgraduate degree in theater and television from Punjabi University, Patiala.

Career
In 2000s, he started with comedies on Television with Bhagwant Mann like Jugnu Mast Mast and Naughty No. 1 alongside serious TV productions like Chitta Lahoo and Parchavain. He also became anchor of Zee Punjabi’s road show Excuse Me Please. He did many stage theatre plays like Khetan Da Putt.

Filmography
 Posti (2022)
 Snowman (2022)
 Shava Ni Girdhari Lal (2021)
 Paani Ch Madhaani (2021)
 Daaka (2019)
 Ardaas Karaan (2019)
 Kesari (2019)
 Banjara (2018)
 Asees (2018)
 Jab Harry Met Sejal (2017)
 Super Singh (2017)
 Manje Bistre (2017)
 Channo Kamli Yaar Di (2016)
 Vaisakhi List (2016)
 Love Punjab (2016)
 Ardaas (2016)
 Oh Yaara Ainvayi Ainvayi Lut Gaya (2015)
 Punjab 1984 (2014)
 Goreyan Nu Daffa Karo (2014)
 Nabar (2013)
 R.S.V.P. (2013)
 Oye Hoye Pyar Ho Gaya (2013)
 Fer Mamla Gadbad Gadbad (2013)
 Daddy Cool Munde Fool (2013)
 Jatt & Juliet 2 (2013)
 Rangeelay(2013)
 Bikkar Bai Sentimental(2013)
 Yamley Jatt Yamley(2012)
 Saadi Wakhri Hai Shaan (2012)
 Ajj De Ranjhe (2012)
 Carry On Jatta (2012)
 Jatt & Juliet (2012)
 Taur Mittran Di (2012)
 Kabaddi Once Again (2012)
 Pata Nahi Rabb Kehdeyan Rangan Ch Raazi (2012)
 Ek Noor (2011)
 Ik Kudi Punjab Di (2015)
 Channa Sachi Muchi (2010)
 Chak Jawaana (2010)
 Chhevan Dariya (The Sixth River) (2010)
 Kabaddi Ikk Mohabbat (2010)
 Lagda Ishq Hogaya (2009)
 Munde U.K. De (2009)
 Mera Pind (2008)
 Mitti Wajaan Maardi (2007)
 Dil Apna Punjabi (2006)
 Rabb Ne Banaiyan Jodiean (2006)

Notable roles

References

External links

 
 
 

Living people
1970 births
Indian male comedians
Indian male voice actors
21st-century Indian male actors
Male actors in Punjabi cinema
Punjabi people
Punjabi University alumni